Damai LRT station is an elevated Light Rail Transit (LRT) station on the Punggol LRT line East Loop in Punggol, Singapore, located at Punggol Drive near the junction of Punggol Road. It was once not opened for passenger service as there was little development around the area. The station was finally opened on 20 June 2011, together with Woodleigh to celebrate the eighth anniversary of the North East line at that time and was the last station along the Punggol LRT line East Loop to be opened.

Etymology

The name means "peaceful" in Malay. It was recommended for reason of cultural diversity in the selection of names. It should not be confused with Jalan Damai, a road which is located off Bedok Reservoir Road in the eastern part of Singapore. The station also took its name of Punggol Damai Residents' Committee (RC) near the station.

References

External links

Railway stations in Singapore opened in 2011
Punggol
LRT stations in Punggol
Railway stations in Punggol
Light Rail Transit (Singapore) stations